Euphorbia dendroides, also known as tree spurge, is a small tree or large shrub of the family Euphorbiaceae that grows in semi-arid and mediterranean climates.

Distribution and habitat 
Euphorbia dendroides has a wide distribution throughout the Mediterranean Sea, from the Balearic Islands in the west to the Aegean Islands in the east. It is found primarily in Europe and is restricted to northern Tunisia in North Africa. This plant is sensitive to frost, so it only grows on protected and sunny mountainsides in hilly areas. It has been introduced to other countries out of its original range as an ornamental tree.

Description 
This bush also has uses in traditional medicine; like many other species of genus Euphorbia its toxic white and sticky sap has been used to treat skin excrescences, like cancers, tumors, and warts since ancient times.

Gallery

References

External links

dendroides
Least concern plants
Plants described in 1753
Taxa named by Carl Linnaeus
Flora of Malta